Greece has claimed an Exclusive Economic Zone (EEZ) as per UNCLOS 1982 as well as customary international law.

Geography

Greece forms the southernmost part of the Balkan peninsula in the Mediterranean Sea. It includes many small islands which vary between 1,200 and 6,000 in the Aegean Sea and the Ionian Sea. The largest islands are Crete, Euboea, Lesbos, Rhodes and Chios.

Greece's EEZ is bordered to the west by Albania and Italy, to the south by Libya and Egypt, and to the east by Cyprus and Turkey.

Disputes and agreements 
Turkey doesn't recognize a legal continental shelf and EEZ around the Greek islands.

According to published maps, the Government of Israel has recognized the EEZ of Greece and Cyprus. They describe the course of the gas pipeline which will transfer gas produced by American Νoble Εnergy Ltd. from the Leviathan reservoir to Europe, through an undersea pipeline crossing Greece. By this proposal, Israel recognizes the Greek EEZ in the area and offers an advantage that Greece can use during negotiation procedures to support its claims on the area. In practice, this cooperation will set up a powerful energy coalition between Greece, Cyprus and Israel. The mining and operating part will be undertaken by an American company. "The substance of the issue is that in an effort to protect and secure vital Israeli interests in the Mediterranean Sea, Israel has been left with no choice other than to officially delimit its maritime borders".

On 8 June 2020, Greece signed an agreement with Italy, establishing an EEZ between the two countries and resolving longstanding issues over fishing rights in the Ionian Sea. 

On 6 August 2020, Greece signed an agreement with Egypt designating an EEZ in the Eastern Mediterranean between the two countries.
Both agreements are in line with Greece's claimed EEZ as per UNCLOS 1982 as well as customary international law. 

In October 2020, Greece and Albania agreed  to refer their EEZ boundary delimitation to the International Court.

See also 
 Aegean dispute
 Imia/Kardak
 Exclusive Economic Zone of Cyprus 
 Cyprus–Turkey maritime zones dispute
 2018 Cyprus gas dispute
 Cyprus dispute
 Libya (GNA)–Turkey maritime deal

References 

Greece
Borders of Greece
Economy of Greece
Greece–Turkey relations